Sanand is one of the 182 Legislative Assembly constituencies of Gujarat state in India. It is part of Ahmedabad district and it came into existence after 2008 delimitation and numbered as 40-Sanand.

List of segments
This assembly seat represents the following segments,

 Sanand Taluka
 Bavla Taluka (Part) Villages – Vasna Nanodara, Nanodara, Kavla, Sankod, Vasna Dhedhal, Dhedhal, Rajoda, Adroda, Hasannagar, Chhabasar, Baldana, Metal, Devdholera, Devadthal, Durgi, Meni, Dumali, Kesrandi, Lagdana, Dahegamda, Ranesar, Amipura,Kochariya, Kerala, Kanotar, Shiyal, Sarala, Kaliveji, Mithapur, Bavla (M).

Members of Legislative Assembly
2012 - Karamshibhai Patel (Makwana), Indian National Congress

Election results

2022

2017

2012

See also
 List of constituencies of the Gujarat Legislative Assembly
 Ahmedabad district

References

External links
 

Assembly constituencies of Gujarat
Ahmedabad district